Bariai (also known as Kabana) is an Austronesian language of New Britain.

Name
The name , literally 'at the mangrove', is derived from  'mangrove' +  'locative suffix'. The alternative name  comes from the Amara language, meaning 'foreigner'.

References

Further reading
 
 
 

Ngero languages
Languages of West New Britain Province